Reversing Falls Park is a municipal park in Pembroke, Maine.  It is located at Mahar Point, the northern point of a narrows separating Dennys Bay from Cobscook Bay in far eastern Maine.  The narrows are subject to a reversal of current twice a day, owing to the area's unusually high tides.  In addition to viewing this action, the park is also well suited for wildlife viewing.

The area in the park vicinity is also archaeologically sensitive, as the site of Native American settlements in the area's prehistory.  It was listed on the National Register of Historic Places in 1990.

See also
National Register of Historic Places listings in Washington County, Maine

References

Archaeological sites on the National Register of Historic Places in Maine
Washington County, Maine
Parks in Maine
National Register of Historic Places in Washington County, Maine